Gonorreia Visceral (Portuguese for "Visceral Gonorrhea") is the first studio album by Portuguese grindcore band Holocausto Canibal. It was released in February 2000 by So Die Music. The album was recorded in 1999 at Rec'n'Gore Studios, in Vila do Conde, Portugal, and was produced by Paulo Brandão. The album was preceded by the oPus I demo tape, released in 1998.

This was the first Portuguese album to feature a gory artwork designed with true photos and not drawings which would become a trademark of the band from that moment on since every subsequent artwork was conceived in a similar way.

In 2014, in an article featured on Portuguese Loud! Magazine on the tenth anniversary of "Sublime Massacre Corpóreo", Holocausto Canibal revealed their plans to re-record "oPus I" and "Gonorreia Visceral" as part of the 15th year celebration of the release of their first album. A few months later, in an interview on "Larvas", they confirmed this intention and pointed out 2015 as the release date of this record, also revealing that they are already working on a new full-length.

Track listing
All music composed by Holocausto Canibal. All lyrics written by Z. Pedro.

Credits
Holocausto Canibal 
Carlos - vocals 
Nuno Pereira - guitar
Jose Pedro - bass 
Joao Lamelas - drums
Production 
Paulo Brandão – sound engineering, producing, mixing, mastering
Christophe Szpajdel – logo

References

2000 albums
Holocausto Canibal albums